Changshou North railway station is a railway station located in Changshou District, Chongqing, People's Republic of China. It is on the Chongqing−Lichuan railway and Chongqing–Wanzhou intercity railway which is operated by China Railway Chengdu Group.

References

Railway stations in Chongqing